Amongst the Asian Boyz, also known as ABZ, AB-26, or ABZ Crips, are a street gang based in Southern California. They were founded in the late 1980s as part of efforts of protection for Cambodian refugees from the more numerous American gangs in their localities. According to the FBI, the gang is predominantly Southeast Asian-American, of which Cambodian account for their majority, while Vietnamese and other Southeast Asians comprise sizable numbers. With approximately 2,000 members, many are known to have enlisted in the U.S. military through which some were able to use their position to traffic drugs. According to the FBI's 2009 National Gang Threat Assessment, the Asian Boyz are active in 28 different cities, in 14 different states across the U.S.

History
The first Asian Boyz gang was formed in Long Beach, California in the late 1980s, drawing members from immigrant communities from Southeast Asia. The founders of Long Beach Asian Boyz were originally Cambodian refugees who were being harassed by the East Side Longos during the 1980s. Controversy lies mostly around the official origin of the gang, as it was a unification of multiple gangs or founding gangsters rather than the formation of one. Their identity also attracts notable controversy, being that the Cambodian sets are notoriously influential and decorated as their own faction of Crips that is, among other things, racially or ethnically distinct. 

During the mid-1980s in Long Beach, a group called the Ultimate Wave made up of Cambodian refugees disbanded and members from that group formed the Tiny Rascal Gang in order to defend themselves from the East Side Longos. In the late 1980s, internal dispute happened within the Tiny Rascal Gang and members left to form the Long Beach Asian Boyz. The Long Beach Asian Boyz subset would be the first of many to come.

One of the Asian gang that integrated with Long Beach Asian Boyz during the early 1990s was the Asian Boys Insanity (ABI). Asian Boys Insanity was an independent gang that operated in Chinatown Los Angeles and parts of San Gabriel Valley in the late-1980s.  Asian Boys Insanity was predominately Chinese and Vietnamese. The victim of the infamous pool hall shooting in El Monte in 1993 was Lea Mek, who was a member of the Asian Boys Insanity. After Asian Boys Insanity merged with Long Beach Asian Boyz, Asian Boys Insanity formed Monterey Park Asian Boyz sometime the early-1990s. Then later in the mid-1990s, both Asian Boys Insanity and Monterey Park Asian Boyz (MP ABZ) became what is now known as West Side Asian Boyz (WS ABZ). 

Other Asian gang that integrated with Long Beach Asian Boyz was called Van Nuys Asian Boys or Asian Boy Style (ABS), which hailed from Van Nuys, Los Angeles. The Asian Boy Style gang was formed in the late-1980s by Sothi "Playa One" Menh, the Mercado brothers, and others.  Asian Boy Style established itself in the Valerio Garden apartments and had members spread out in other parts of Los Angeles county. By the mid-1990s, Van Nuys Asian Boy Style merged with Van Nuys Asian Boyz (a branch of Long Beach Asian Boyz) and became one gang.

Notable crimes

In 1990–1991, Pierre Mercado was responsible for four murders, in an attempt to intimidate other gangs. He fled to the Philippines and remained there for 11 years until he was extradited to the United States in 2012. In 2013, Mercado was sentenced to 218 years to life in prison.

In August 1997, the leader of the Asian Boyz Van Nuys set, Sothi Menh, was arrested in Phnom Penh, Cambodia and extradited to the United States after fleeing the country in the preceding January. He was wanted for committing five gang-related murders in the San Fernando Valley in 1995. In September 1998, Asian Boyz members were charged with three murders and five attempted murders.

On August 12, 2006, a fight broke out between Asian Bloods and ABZ gang members at a house in Lowell, Massachusetts, where a birthday party was being held. Asian Boyz members left the party and allegedly started throwing bottles and other objects. Billeoum Phan, 14, began firing at the Asian Boyz members. One of the shots hit Asian Boyz member Samnang Oth, killing him. Phan was convicted of manslaughter and sentenced to incarceration until the age of 21, with an additional requirement to serve a 5-year probation after his release.

In December 2006, three members of the gang were charged with beating a 15-year-old boy named Sang Vu to death in Utica, New York. Richie Nguyen, who was 16, was sentenced to 5 to 15 years of prison for manslaughter. Samnang Chou was sentenced to 10 years of prison for second-degree assault.

In March 2008, four men followed 24-year-old Vutha Au from Santa Rosa and stopped at a gas station near Jenner, California, where they fatally shot him in public. Quentin Russell, who was age 24 at the time, was the shooter, and Sarith Prak, David Prak, and Preston Khaoone were charged in connection with the murder. All four defendants were convicted and sentenced to life without parole on July 27, 2012.

In March 2011, founder Marvin Mercado was sentenced to life imprisonment for his mid 1990s murder of eight people.

In December 2018, a high-ranking member named Derek Pires was arrested in Fall River, Massachusetts following a shooting that left no injuries.

On April 15, 2019, five Asian Boyz and a Santa Monica 17th Street gang member were ambushed by a group of El Monte Flores 13 gang members at an Asian Boyz-run gambling den in Monterey Park, California. A shoot-out occurred, but there were no reported injuries, and a total of nine people were arrested in the days after.

Membership 
According to the FBI's 2009 National Gang Threat Assessment, membership is estimated at 5,000-10,000 members. Originally, most members were Cambodian, with a small portion of other Southeast Asian members. In the 1980s, the Asian Boyz expanded across the United States. Many factions remained in California, where they are still concentrated. Other factions spread throughout the Midwest and into New England. Factions have their own regional differences, which may include distinctions in culture, identity, structure and ethnic exclusivity.

On the West Coast, the Asian Boyz gang colors are blue and navy. These colors are similar to the Crips who the Asian Boyz learned from and were heavily influenced by. While their speech and mannerisms are similar to those of Crips, they are known to dress in the fashion of West Coast trends, dated to the 1980s and 1990s. Younger members are known to dress along with current fashion trends. 

In the Midwest and on the East Coast, along with blue and navy, the gang also dons forest green, black, and white. Their style of dress leans more towards hip-hop casual. In the Midwest, members are known to be of Hmong, Burmese, Karen and Karenni descent while on the East Coast, specifically in New York, there are a lot more members of Korean and Chinese descent. In Utica there are many members of Karen descent, and many  Cambodians, Vietnamese Americans, and Laotians in Massachusetts. Asian Boyz gang tattoos include a dragon head with crystal globes, a symbol of high rank and original Status. Also common are Sak Yant tattoos that are supposed to offer power, protection, fortune, charisma and other benefits for the bearer.

Hereafter they are also known to have members in Indiana Indianapolis and Fort Wayne, Minnesota, New York, Texas, and Massachusetts as well as within the U.S. Armed Forces.

Rivalries

Many members of the Asian Boyz has been in a long conflict with the Wah Ching gang. One of the first shootouts between the two gangs occurred in the 1990s in an El Monte pool hall. An Asian Boyz gang member, Lea Mek, was killed by Wah Ching gang member Chieu Luong Yang.

Another shootout between the two gangs occurred in San Marino that led to the deaths of two youths at a San Marino High School graduation party in June. After an investigation by the authorities, police claimed that when the Asian Boyz gang members arrived at the party, they noticed that Wah Ching gang members were there, prompting them to leave and return with weapons. At least nine gang members were arrested, and police seized five weapons from homes searched in conjunction with the arrests. The shootouts between the two gangs were called "Summer Madness" by the Asian Boyz gang.

References

Organizations established in the 1990s
1990s establishments in California
Organizations based in Long Beach, California
Asian-American gangs
Street gangs
Crips subgroups
Gangs in Los Angeles
Gangs in Massachusetts
Gangs in New York (state)
Gangs in New Mexico
Cambodian-American culture
Asian-American culture in Los Angeles
Filipino-American culture in California